Ashton Gate railway station was a railway station serving the Ashton Gate area of Bristol, England, which included Ashton Gate football ground, the home ground of Bristol City F.C. It was located on the Portishead Railway.

Recent proposals have been made for the station to reopen as part of the MetroWest project to improve rail transport in the Greater Bristol area.

History

The line was built as  broad-gauge, and was largely single track. The line was relaid as  standard gauge between 24 and 27 January 1880, and in 1883 the line was double-tracked.

Ashton Gate station was built after local football team Bristol City were promoted to the Football League First Division, then the top tier of English football. The station was opened to serve their home ground, Ashton Gate Stadium, which was situated nearby. The station opened for supporters on 15 September 1906, and to the general public on 1 October that year. In 1914 it was temporarily renamed "Exhibition Station" for the Bristol International Exhibition.

The station closed due to economies during the First World War. It then passed on to the Western Region of British Railways on nationalisation in 1948. It was then closed by the British Railways Board in 1964, then briefly reopened for traffic to the football ground until 1977, and temporarily re-opened in May 1984 to serve Mission England, a series of evangelical rallies by Billy Graham at the football ground.

Future
The Portishead Branch Line is to be reopened as part of the MetroWest scheme, a rail transport plan which aims to enhance transport capacity in the Bristol area.  The scheme was given the go-ahead in July 2012 as part of the City Deal, whereby local councils would be given greater control over money by the government. A consultation on the plans was held between 22 June and 3 August 2015 to gather views from the community and stakeholders before moving on to detailed designs. The detailed proposals will be subject to a second consultation before the plans are finalised. Due to the additional capital costs, the line will not be electrified, however the design will include passive provision for future electrification. The line through Ashton Gate would be increased to double track. Network Rail stated that it was not feasible to reopen Ashton Gate during the initial stage of the project, but that the scheme will be future-proofed to allow the construction of a station at a later date.

Trains could also be extended on to the Severn Beach Line. The trains used will be diesel multiple units, likely three carriages long. The line will be operated as part of the Greater Western passenger franchise. Great Western Railway, a subsidiary of FirstGroup, currently operate the Greater Western franchise, however their contract expires in early 2019, before services to Portishead are due to start. In May 2016, it was reported that Bristol City Council did not consider there was a business case for the station's reopening due to its low predicted annual patronage of 67,000 excluding Bristol City matches.

Notes

References

 
 

Notes to references:

External links

 Pictures of the station

Former Great Western Railway stations
Disused railway stations in Bristol
Railway stations in Great Britain opened in 1906
Railway stations in Great Britain closed in 1964
Beeching closures in England